Żerocin  is a village in the administrative district of Gmina Drelów, within Biała Podlaska County, Lublin Voivodeship, in eastern Poland. From 1975–1998 Żerocin was in the now defunct Biała Podlaska Voivodeship.

The village has a population of 580.

References

Villages in Biała Podlaska County
Siedlce Governorate
Kholm Governorate
Lublin Voivodeship (1919–1939)